Lauren Hew (born 26 September 1999) is a swimmer from the Cayman Islands.

In 2019, she represented Cayman Islands at the World Aquatics Championships held in Gwangju, South Korea. She competed in the women's 50 metre freestyle and women's 100 metre freestyle events. In both events she did not advance to compete in the semi-finals. She also competed in the 4 × 100 metre mixed freestyle relay event. In the same year, she also represented the Cayman Islands at the 2019 Pan American Games held in Lima, Peru.

References

External links 
 Lauren Hew at Florida State Seminoles
 

1999 births
Living people
People from Grand Cayman
Caymanian female swimmers
Caymanian female freestyle swimmers
Swimmers at the 2019 Pan American Games
Pan American Games competitors for the Cayman Islands
Florida State Seminoles women's swimmers
Swimmers at the 2014 Commonwealth Games
Swimmers at the 2018 Commonwealth Games
Commonwealth Games competitors for the Cayman Islands